Mount Lawit (Gunung Lawit) is a mountain on the island of Borneo. It is 1767 metres tall and sits on the international border between Indonesia and Malaysia. On the Indonesian side of the border, the mountain is within the Betung Kerihun National Park.

Lawit
Lawit
Indonesia–Malaysia border
Mountains of Sarawak